Nick Hatton is a South African rugby union player for the  in the Currie Cup. His regular position is flanker or number eight.

Hatton was a mid-season addition to the  side for the 2022 Currie Cup Premier Division.

References

South African rugby union players
Living people
Rugby union flankers
Rugby union number eights
Sharks (Currie Cup) players
Year of birth missing (living people)